Antichloris caca is a moth of the family Erebidae. It was described by Jacob Hübner in 1818. It is found in Guatemala, Panama, Suriname and Brazil (Para, Rio de Janeiro).

References

Moths described in 1818
Euchromiina
Moths of Central America
Moths of South America